Hugh Gordon (1794–1854) was a violin maker from Stoneyford, County Antrim, Northern Ireland. It is estimated that he may have made as many as 50 violins. His instruments were labelled on the inside with the date and branded on the back below the button 'Gordon'. Gordon was also an accomplished blacksmith and farmer.

Legacy 

Over 150 years after Gordon's death, his first biography, Gordon of Stoneyford, Violin Maker by Michael Costello was published in 2010. The book was dedicated to the descendants of Hugh Gordon, some of whom still reside in Stoneyford and the surrounding areas. Several lectures on the life and work of Gordon, as well as demonstrations of his violins, have been given by writer Costello to societies such as Killultagh Historical Society, October 2008, and the Lisburn Historical Society in December 2009.

In 2011, BBC Northern Ireland produced a short documentary on Gordon. The documentary featured author Costello and fiddle player Geordie McAdam who examined some of Gordon's surviving instruments from Costello's personal collection.

References

1794 births
1854 deaths
19th-century Irish people
Bowed string instrument makers
Irish musical instrument makers
Irish luthiers
People from County Antrim